In mathematics, the category of topological vector spaces is the category whose objects are topological vector spaces and whose morphisms are continuous linear maps between them. This is a category because the composition of two continuous linear maps is again a continuous linear map.  The category is often denoted TVect or TVS.

Fixing a topological field K, one can also consider the subcategory TVectK of topological vector spaces over K with continuous K-linear maps as the morphisms.

TVect is a concrete category

Like many categories, the category TVect is a concrete category, meaning its objects are sets with additional structure (i.e. a vector space structure and a topology) and its morphisms are functions preserving this structure. There are obvious forgetful functors into the category of topological spaces, the category of vector spaces and the category of sets.

TVect is a topological category

The category is topological, which means loosely speaking that it relates to its "underlying category", the category of vector spaces, in the same way that Top relates to Set. Formally, for every K-vector space  and every family  of topological K-vector spaces  and K-linear maps  there exists a vector space topology  on  so that the following property is fulfilled:

Whenever  is a K-linear map from a topological K-vector space  it holds that
 is continuous   is continuous.

The topological vector space  is called "initial object" or "initial structure" with respect to the given data.

If one replaces "vector space" by "set" and "linear map" by "map", one gets a characterisation of the usual initial topologies in Top. This is the reason why categories with this property are called "topological".

There are numerous consequences of this property. For example:

 "Discrete" and "indiscrete" objects exist. A topological vector space is indiscrete iff it is the initial structure with respect to the empty family. A topological vector space is discrete iff it is the initial structure with respect to the family of all possible linear maps into all topological vector spaces. (This family is a proper class, but that does not matter: Initial structures with respect to all classes exists iff they exists with respect to all sets)
 Final structures (the similar defined analogue to final topologies) exist. For example: The discrete objects (= final with respect to the empty family) in  do not carry the discrete topology.
 Since the following diagram of forgetful functors commutes

This left adjoint defines "free topological vector spaces". Explicitly these are free K-vector spaces equipped with a certain initial topology.
 Since  is (co)complete,  is (co)complete too.

See also

References 

 

Topological vector spaces
Topological vector spaces